The Monmouth War Memorial commemorates the Monmouth fallen of the First and Second World Wars.

Location 

The Monmouth War Memorial is located in Monmouth, Monmouthshire, Wales. It is positioned in the centre of St. James' Square, within the roundabout of Whitecross Street, Old Dixton Road, and St. James' Street. The Catalpa tree behind the cenotaph was imported from North America and planted about 1900. At the time of the unveiling of the monument in 1921, the Catalpa was already a mature tree. There are formal plantings on three sides of the memorial. The monument, plantings, and adjacent lawn are surrounded by railings. The Indian Bean Tree, however, was condemned by the Monmouthshire City Council. Opponents of the decision to fell the tree hired a professional arboriculturalist who concluded that the tree could be treated to extend its life.

Description 

The Monmouth War Memorial was created by sculptor W. Clarke of Llandaff. The war monument is composed of a three-step base and column, upon which there is the figure of a soldier. The column has multiple metal plaques, including two on the front. The upper, smaller plaque indicates that the monument commemorates the residents of Monmouth who died in both World War I and World War II. It reads: "To the memory of the Monmouth men who fell in the wars 1914–1918 1939–1945." The lower, larger plaque on the front of the monument lists the deceased Monmouth soldiers of the Second World War, 1939 to 1945.

Statutory List of Buildings 

The war memorial is on the Statutory List of Buildings of Special Architectural or Historic Interest in the United Kingdom. It was listed as a Grade II structure on 8 October 2005. Such structures are considered to be "nationally important and of special interest." Ninety-two percent of listed buildings are of this grade. The monument's record is in the collection of the Royal Commission on the Ancient and Historical Monuments of Wales. The Cadw Building ID Number for the Monmouth War Memorial is 85239. Cadw is the historic environment service for the government of Wales. The Welsh term "cadw" means to keep or protect.

References

External links 
 Photographs of Monmouth War Memorial

Cenotaphs in the United Kingdom
Grade II listed monuments and memorials
British military memorials and cemeteries
World War I memorials in Wales
World War II memorials in Wales
History of Monmouthshire
Buildings and structures in Monmouth, Wales
Monuments and memorials in Monmouthshire